Brian Charles Chatton (born 19 July 1948 in Farnworth, Lancashire, England) is an English keyboardist, author and songwriter. He played with bands like the Warriors with singer Jon Anderson and then formed another group named Hickory with drummer and singer Phil Collins, they changed their name for Flaming Youth. Then he joined ex-bassist of The Nice, Lee Jackson, when the latter formed the second lineup of a band called Jackson Heights.

Biography

Early years
Chatton was born in Farnworth, Lancashire, England. From 1950 to 1965, the family lived in Kearsley.

From 1961, Chatton was in The Three Jets with lead guitarist Barry Reynolds (b. 27 October 1949, Bolton, Lancashire, England) and drummer Johnny Pickup.

From November 1965 to 1967, Chatton was in the Warriors, with Jon Anderson on vocals, his brother Tony Anderson on vocals and harmonica, Rod Hill and Mike Brereton on guitars, Dave Foster on bass (later in Badger with ex-Yes keyboardist Tony Kaye) and future King Crimson drummer Ian Wallace. Jon would eventually join Yes. When Chatton and Anderson moved to London, Chatton met Phil Collins and they formed a band to back John Walker of The Walker Brothers. Leaving Walker, the pair formed their own band, Hickory, which then evolved into Flaming Youth.

1970s
He played keyboards in Jackson Heights from their second album on. Around 1974, he was in Snafu for a short period, alongside Micky Moody and Colin Gibson. He appeared on their third album, All Funked Up, released 1975. He was on the first Rock Follies album in 1976. He joined a band put together by Chas Chandler (Animals) and backed Eric Burdon for 8 months, which included dates with both Santana, and Journey at Wembley Stadium. He also wrote the music for Eric's lyrics for a movie featuring Terence Stamp, called "Les Human." He did various sessions in London, playing with Ginger Baker. 3–5-year touring, recording and touring with John Miles band. Toured in America for first time. Roger Glover (Deep Purple) Mike Giles (King Crimson) Jack Green (Marc Bolan/Pretty Things) played on 4 of Jack's albums. Nico McBrain, Pat Travers, Iron Maiden, John Porter, Shep Pettibone (Producer – Pet Shop Boys)

In July 1979, Chatton joined Anderson, Allan Holdsworth, Jack Bruce and Adrian Tilbrook for a one-off performance in London as The All-Star Rock Band.

1980s
He wrote "Take My Love and Run" for The Hollies, their last Polydor single, released in 1981. He also appeared with The Hollies when they promoted the single on TV. He wrote further material for the band's next album, What Goes Around.

He toured with Meatloaf in 1984.

He co-wrote the title track of Madness, Money & Music, Sheena Easton's third album.

In the 1980s, he was in Boys Don't Cry, who had a hit single with "I Wanna Be a Cowboy". They also included their own version of "Take My Love and Run" on certain versions of their first full-length album. They released three albums during the 80s and reformed to release new material in 2014.

Other work
He later collaborated on the Uzlot project with Jon Anderson. It stood for over 30 years and then material from this was re-worked and included on Anderson's 1000 Hands solo album, which was released in March 2019. He wrote 7 of the 11 songs =, played some keyboards and sang some backing vocals. Guests on 1000 Hands playing Brian's material include: Chick Corea, Billy Cobham, Jean Luc Ponty, Steve Howe, Alan White, Ian Anderson and many more. He has also worked with BB King, Robin Gibb, Keith Emerson, Alan White, Brian Auger, Albert Lee. He has also written music for TV and many adverts featured around the world.

Recent years
He now lives in California and self published his autobiography, Rolling with Rock Royalty, in 2020. Promotional work for the book also involves former Yes keyboardist, Tony Kaye. Charlotte and Emily Chatton are his daughters.

Lists of collaborators

B.B. King
Phil Collins
Meat Loaf+Neverland Express1985
The Hollies
Joe Cocker
Albert Lee
Jack Bruce
Ginger Baker
Keith Emerson
Jon Anderson
Tony Kaye
Alan White
Chris Squire
Peter Frampton
Ian Wallace
Steve Holley
Pauli Cerra
Allan Holdsworth
Levon Helm
Laurence Juber
Tim Bogert
Raymond Gomez
Kevin Eubanks (Tonight Show)
Don Peake
Carmine Appice
Steve Lilliwhite
Mel Collins
Ian Paice
Denny Laine
Cozy Powell
Robin Gibb
Richie Blackmore
Alvin Lee
Barry Barlow
Boz Burrell
Mick Ralphs
Chris DeBurgh
Mo Foster
BJ Cole
Clive Bunker
Julian Colbeck
Deon Estus (Wham)
Roger Glover (Deep Purple)
Mike Giles (King Crimson)
Jack Green (Marc Bolan/Pretty Things) played on 4 of Jack's albums.
Dave Carlock (TUBES, Pink),
Nico McBrain (Pat Travers, Iron Maiden)
John Porter
Shep Pettibone (Producer – Pet Shop Boys)
Pat Travers (3 albums & live work)
John Miles (Tina Turner, Joe Cocker)
Mike Slamer
Chester Thompson (Genesis)
Andy MacKay (Roxy Music)
Lemmy
Hans Zimmer
Mike & Tim Franklyn (Bruce Hornsby, Joe Walsh)
Danny Lehrman
Rob Vukelich studio owner / engineer / producer Several solo projects + Uzlot with Jon Anderson
John Altman
James Zota Baker ( War / Edgar Winter / Amanda Haley )
Irvin Magic Kramer (Ray Charles)
Ted Springman (Tony Kaye)
Scott Moyer (session musician)
Clem Burke (Blondie)

Discography

Solo
Playing for Time (1981), as Chatton, with Phil Collins among others
Spellbound (1989)
Chatton Classic Covers – Chapter One (2000)
Industrial Variety, library music

The Warriors
- Single :
You Came Along/Don't Make Me Blue (1964)

- Albums :
Bolton Club (2003)
The Lost Demos (2020)

Flaming Youth
- Singles :
Guide Me, Orion/From Now On (Immortal Invisible) (1969)
Man, Woman And Child/Drifting (1969)
From Now On (Immortal Invisible)/Space Child (1969)
Guide me, Orion/Earthglow/Pulsar/From now on ( Immortal Invisible ) (1969)

- Album :
Ark 2 (1969)

Jackson Heights
The Fifth Avenue Bus (1972)
Ragamuffin's Fool (1973)
Bump 'n' Grind (1973)

Snafu
All Funked Up (1975; CD reissue 2000)

Rock Follies
Rock Follies (1976)

John Miles
More Miles Per Hour (1979)
Sympathy (1980)
Miles High (1981)

Boys Don't Cry
Don't Talk to Strangers (EP) (1983), before he was an official member
Boys Don't Cry (1986)
Who the Am Dam Do You Think We Am? (1987)
White Punks on Rap (2009), with unreleased songs from 1983 to 1999
Hear It Is (2014)

Sessions
Andy Mackay, In Search of Eddie Riff (1974)
Alan Hull, Squire (1975)
Brian Parrish, Love on My Mind (1976)
Pat Travers, Pat Travers (1976)
Vapour Trails, Vapour Trails (1979)
Jack Green, Humanesque (1980)
Jack Green, Reverse Logic (1981)
The Hollies, What Goes Around (1983)
Keith Emerson, Best Revenge (1986)
Pat Travers, Halfway to Somewhere (1995)
Jon Anderson, 1000 Hands: Chapter One (2019)

References

External links
 Official website
 Rolling with Rock Royalty, Chatton's autobiography

1948 births
Living people
English keyboardists
English rock keyboardists
English songwriters
English expatriates in the United States
People from Farnworth
Flaming Youth (band) members